Eddy Gutiérrez (born 28 February 1952) is a Cuban former sprinter who competed in the 1976 Summer Olympics.

References

1952 births
Living people
Cuban male sprinters
Olympic athletes of Cuba
Athletes (track and field) at the 1976 Summer Olympics
Athletes (track and field) at the 1975 Pan American Games
Pan American Games silver medalists for Cuba
Pan American Games medalists in athletics (track and field)
Central American and Caribbean Games gold medalists for Cuba
Competitors at the 1974 Central American and Caribbean Games
Central American and Caribbean Games medalists in athletics
Medalists at the 1975 Pan American Games
20th-century Cuban people